Jamie Aube (born August 4, 1953) is an American stock car racing driver. He raced in the NASCAR Grand National Division, Busch East Series, where he has won three consecutive championships. He also has one career win in the NASCAR Busch Series, at Oxford Plains Speedway in 1987.

In 2003, Aube ran in the Craftsman Truck Series in a limited schedule, driving trucks fielded by Team Racing. In eleven starts, his best finish was seventeenth at New Hampshire International Speedway. He also served as crew chief on the team.

In 2006 he returned to the NASCAR Busch East Series driving the #67 Chevrolet, garnering 1 top 10 in 7 starts.

Following his retirement from NASCAR competition Aube worked as a crew chief in the K&N Pro Series East, as well as competing in selected American Canadian Tour races.

Motorsports career results

NASCAR
(key) (Bold – Pole position awarded by qualifying time. Italics – Pole position earned by points standings or practice time. * – Most laps led.)

Winston Cup Series

Busch Series

Craftsman Truck Series

 Competed only in companion events with Busch North Series as BNS driver and ineligible for Busch Series points

References

External links 

Living people
1953 births
People from Charlotte, Vermont
Racing drivers from Vermont
NASCAR drivers
NASCAR crew chiefs
American Speed Association drivers
People from Bow, New Hampshire